The Democratic Forum of Germans in Romania (DFDR; , FDGR; in short  or ) is a political party (legally recognized as an association of public utility according to the governmental decision HG 599 as per 4 June 2008) organised on ethnic criterion representing the interests of the German minority in Romania.

Initially, the FDGR/DFDR was a cultural association representing the culture of the German community in Romania, but it subsequently became a moderately successful local political party (especially amongst Romanian voters as well), most notably in parts of Transylvania (central Romania) and Banat (south-western Romania). Consequently, the counties where the FDGR/DFDR obtained the highest political scores in many local elections after 1989 are Sibiu and Timiș respectively.

History (1989–present) 

The forum was founded at the end of 1989, in the wake of the Romanian Revolution which culminated with the downfall of Nicolae Ceaușescu's dictatorship. Despite originally being a German minority party (and, initially, a cultural organization), it gradually grew quite popular amongst many ethnic Romanians, especially in parts of Transylvania and Banat, including, most notably, the major town of Sibiu, where the party still holds a majority in the local town council (12 out of 23 seats), as well as in the County of Sibiu. Aside from its significant presence in Transylvania and Banat, the FDGR/DFDR is also active in Bukovina (i.e. Suceava County), yet without any elected representatives in the local politics, acting instead in the manner of a cultural foundation which periodically organizes a wide range of educational and cultural events.

In terms of reputation, the party is regarded as independent, whilst its politicians, including former Sibiu mayor, former party leader, and current President of Romania, Klaus Johannis, have earned respect as thorough administrators. The FDGR/DFDR has often cooperated with the National Liberals (PNL), to which Iohannis became a member and one of its prime leaders (as vice-president) starting from February 2013. Additionally, the FDGR/DFDR also has a youth wing known as the German Youth Federation in Romania, currently headed by Adelheid Simon.

At local administration level, most notably in Timișoara or Baia Mare, the FDGR/DFDR has also co-operated with another Romanian centre-right historical party, namely the PNȚCD. For the 2020 Romanian local elections however, the FDGR/DFDR supported Dominic Fritz (the candidate of the USR PLUS, now USR) for the seat of mayor of Timișoara which the latter also won in the first round with 53.24% over former national liberal (PNL) mayor Nicolae Robu.

In recent years, the main headquarters of FDGR/DFDR in Sibiu organised several foreign receptions of high ranking German officials, among which most notably there were former Christian Democratic Union of Germany (CDU) leader and former chancellor Angela Merkel or president Joachim Gauck.

Overview and organization 

The history of the German minority in Romania, and mostly, their presence in the historical region of Transylvania, spans approximately a millennium back in time. Nevertheless, under the blanket term "Romanian Germans" a wide variety of different regional German-speaking groups are included (some which are native to other regions of Romania) as follows:
  Transylvanian Saxons (the eldest ethnic German sub-group on the territory of present-day Romania);
  Banat Swabians (including Banat Highland Germans);
  Sathmar Swabians;
  Bukovina Germans;
  Transylvanian Landler;
  Zipser Germans;
  Regat Germans;
  Dobrujan Germans;
  Bessarabia Germans (former Romanian citizens between 1918 and 1940).

Since 2000, the FDGR/DFDR has won offices on both local and regional levels. In Sibiu, the FDGR/DFDR's Klaus Johannis has held the office of mayor from 2000 to 2014. In 2004, the forum gained 60.43% of votes in local elections for the Municipal Council. In addition, the FDGR/DFDR held 12 out of 23 seats in the Sibiu Municipal Council, forming an absolute majority alongside the PNL.

Following the 2016 local elections in Sibiu County (which has a population of about 450,000 residents), the FDGR/DFDR won 8 out of 33 seats in the County Council, where it is the third strongest political faction, after the National Liberals (PNL) and Social Democrats (PSD).

The FDGR/DFDR has also had mayors in office since 2004 in the cities of Mediaș and Cisnădie, as well as in a few villages in Satu Mare county. The FDGR/DFDR is an associated member of the Federal Union of European Nationalities and was formerly affiliated with the European People's Party.

Additionally, at local political level, the FDGR/DFDR is organized in five distinct branches as follows: FDGR Banat, FDGR Bucovina, FDGR Transilvania, FDGR Transilvania de Nord, and FDGR Regiunea Extra-carpatică.

Controversies 

Both during and after the 2014 presidential campaign of former FDGR/DFDR president Klaus Johannis, who subsequently became president of the National Liberal Party (PNL) during the autumn of the same year, the Social Democratic Party (PSD) accused the forum of being the legal continuator of the German Ethnic Group concerning alleged dubious retrocessions of several buildings from Sibiu by Johannis during his terms as mayor to the forum itself. While the German Ethnic group was indeed a fascist organisation during World War II which represented the German minority in Romania between 1940 and 1944, the FDGR/DFDR is a distinct platform which has nothing to do with the latter, consequently not inheriting anything from it.

Presidents 

 1990–1992: Thomas Nägler;
 1992–1998: Paul Philippi{{efn|Also subsequently served as Honorary president of the FDGR/DFDR}};
 1998–2001: Eberhard Wolfgang Wittstock;
 2001–2013: Klaus Werner Johannis;
 2013–present: Paul-Jürgen Porr.Medicul Paul Porr este noul președinte al FDGR, 10 July 2013, Mediafax

 Chronology of FDGR/DFDR deputies 
 1990–1992: Ingmar Brandsch;
 1992–1996: Eberhard Wolfgang Wittstock;
 1996–1997: Werner Horst Brück;
 1997–2004: Eberhard Wolfgang Wittstock;
 2004–present: Ovidiu Victor Ganț.ADZ: Ovidiu Ganţ resümiert zehn Jahre Politik - Der Abgeordnete stellt in Bukarest sein Buch vor, 22 September 2011

 Localities with FDGR/DFDR mayors 

 2016 Romanian local elections 

After the 2016 Romanian local elections, the FDGR/DFDR candidates won the following localities (most of them belonging to Satu Mare County):
 Cămin, Imre Sütő;
 Sanislău, Ioan-Zoltan Kardosi;
 Turulung, Gheorghe-Nicolae Gyákon;
 Petreşti, Iosif Mellau;
 Sibiu, Astrid Fodor.

Furthermore, the FDGR/DFDR also held 91 local councillor seats in 32 communes.

 2020 Romanian local elections 

After the 2020 Romanian local elections, the FDGR/DFDR candidates won the following localities (most of them belonging to Satu Mare County):
 Cămin, Imre Sütő;
 Sanislău, Ioan-Zoltan Kardosi;
 Turulung, Gheorghe-Nicolae Gyákon;
 Petreşti, Marchis Gheorghe Otto;
 Sibiu, Astrid Fodor.

In addition, the party now holds 68 local council seats (39 in Satu Mare, 13 in Sibiu, 10 in Brașov, 4 in Timiș, 1 in Maramureș, and 1 in Arad) as well as 5 county council seats in Sibiu County.

 Notable FDGR/DFDR politicians 

 Astrid Fodor, the current mayor of Sibiu
 Wilhelm Fabini, sculptor and artist
 Martin Bottesch, former President of the Sibiu County Council
 Ovidiu Victor Ganț, member of Parliament and MEP for Romania (2007–09)
 Daniel Thellmann, former mayor of Mediaș and founding member of DFDR/FDGR
 Klaus Johannis, 5th President of Romania
 Paul Philippi, theologian and President of FDGR/DFDR
 Eberhard Wolfgang Wittstock, journalist and former FDGR/DFDR Member of Parliament
 Arnold Günter Klingeis, former mayor of Avrig
 Josef-Otto Exner, president of the ACI Bukowina Stiftung in the town of Suceava
 Trudi Wiski, local president for FDGR Cârlibaba
 Josef Robert Stadler, local president for FDGR Frasin
 Siegfried Kwirsfeld, local president for FDGR Vatra Dornei

 Electoral performance 

 Local elections 

 Legislative elections 

 See also 
 Romanian ethnic minority parties

 Further reading 

 Step by step, autobiographical volume by Klaus Iohannis and bestseller in the history of Gaudeamus International Book and Education Fair
 2015 – First step, a continuation of the volume "Step by step" of 2014. The volume details his plans as president.
 2019 – EU.RO – un dialog deschis despre Europa''

Notes

References

External links 
 Romanian Chamber of Deputies
  Hermannstädter Zeitung
  Romanian Department of Internal Affairs  (some information in English)
  Allgemeine Deutsche Zeitung für Rumänien
  Verband der Siebenbürger Sachsen in Deutschland
  Deutsches Forum der Banater Berglanddeutschen
  Deutsches Forum Kronstadt
  Deutsches Forum Sathmar
  Deutsches Forum Bistritz
  Deutsches Forum Klausenburg
  Deutsches Forum Schäßburg

Political parties established in 1989
German diaspora political parties
German organizations in Romania
Political parties of minorities in Romania
Non-registered political parties in Romania
1989 establishments in Romania